Mahdi Abdul Hadi (born 22 March 1944) is a political scientist, historian, columnist, author, founder and member of various Palestinian, Arab and International institutions. He founded and heads the Palestinian Academic Society for the Study of International Affairs.

Hadi was born in Nablus but has spent most of his life in Jerusalem. He holds a Ph.D. from the School of Peace Studies at the University of Bradford in the United Kingdom. He has devoted most of his life to academic research and dialogue, as well as the publication of this research with the aim of providing a deep understanding of Palestinian issues, past and present – the land, the people, their rights and their leadership – to interested audiences in the region and beyond. He has founded and co-founded numerous forums and institutes. For example, he co-founded the Al-Fajr Palestinian daily newspaper in 1972 as well as the Palestinian Council for Higher Education (1977–1980).

Family
Hadi's family roots can be traced back to the seventh century when – according to one theory – the Abdul Hadi family then an Arab tribe from Yemen came to Jerusalem with Umar ibn al-Khattab. Later the family used to govern the area of Nablus as well as Acre and was widely known as landlords. Until today they own large areas of property around Nablus and Jenin. During the Ottoman rule over Palestine, members of the Hadi family were not only active in government positions but also in opposition movements. Since then, the family has played a central role in Palestinian society in general and, especially, within the Palestinian national movement.

Early life
Hadi was born in Nablus on 22 March 1944 and spent most of his early childhood in Jaffa where his father Fouad Abdul Hadi was a landlord in Palestine (the Arabian Triangle – Khidara). During the 1948 Arab-Israeli War the family had to leave their home and they became refugees in Lebanon. Together with his two brothers, Abdul Hadi and Salameh, Mahdi Abdul Hadi joined the Jesuit St. Joseph School in Junieh, Beirut. He was taught in Beirut upon the family's return to Nablus in 1950 where his father worked as judge in the district court which had by then became part of the Jordanian Ministry of Justice.

Education
In the following decade Hadi received his primary and secondary education at various institutions in the West Bank, such as the national Najah School (1950–1952), Ahliya School (1952–1955), the Ibn Rushd School in Hebron (1955–1957), the German Schneller School in Bethlehem (1958), the Friends Boys School in Ramallah (1959–1960), the Khalil Sakakani School in Jerusalem (1961–1962) and the Rashidiya School (1962–1963). He completed his secondary education (Tawjihi) in Cairo at the National Educational School Zamalek in Cairo (1964).

Afterwards, he enrolled at law school in Damascus which he completed with a bachelor's degree in Law (1965–1970). During the time of his studies he worked as a clerk in the district court in Jerusalem under the judges Tayseer Kan’an and Fahad Abu al-Atham until Jerusalem was occupied by the Israeli army during the Six-Day War in June 1967. Subsequently, he joined the general strike by Arab lawyers protesting against the Israeli occupation in general and the annexation of Jerusalem in particular.

Career
After studying law at Damascus University and he started his career as a lawyer continuing the family tradition. However, realizing that the law was not the best way to confront the many challenges the Palestinians were facing, he soon moved into the realm of mass media and established, along with Yousef Nasri Naser and Jamil Hamad, Al-Fajr (the dawn) newspaper (1972). He worked as editor for Al-Fajr and published a large number of articles and editorials under an alias. After the kidnapping of Naser in 1972, Hadi felt the urge to start writing about the Palestinian question. Thus, soon after he published his first book, The Question of Palestine and Peaceful Solutions, which focused on debates, initiatives and ideas on a settlement of the conflict between the Israelis and Palestinians in the period of 1934 to 1974, which was published in Lebanon.

In 1977, Hadi founded the Arab Thought Forum, a Palestinian think-tank, which brought together a range of intellectuals, academics and politicians. Within the forum the group developed the idea of the National Guidance Committee and later also established it. The Committee was successful in governing Palestinian society, in terms of building consensus and harmony, breaking the ice between opposing factions and maintaining the balance between the leadership inside and outside the occupied Palestinian territories. Abdul Hadi was elected its President and functioned as such until 1980. Abdul Hadi also worked with Birzeit University (1977–1980) to set up the first Palestinian public relations office in 1977. The office was established to build a deeper and wider understanding of the political situation through the exchange of ideas and the spread of information which was undertaken via bulletins, leaflets, publications, articles and meetings between active individuals and institutions. In 1977 Abdul Hadi co-founded the Council for Higher Education in the West Bank together with Ibrahim Dakak, Gires Khouri and Gabi Baramki and served as its elected Secretary General until 1980.

In 1981 he decided to continue his higher education and enrolled at the School of Peace Studies at Bradford University in the United Kingdom from where he obtained his Ph.D. in 1984 focusing his dissertation on Palestinian-Jordanian relations during the period from 1921 until 1951. In order to even further broaden his grasp of global issues, he continued his education at the Harvard Center of International Affairs where he stayed as fellow for one year (1984–1985). During this time Abdul Hadi further developed his ideas about and knowledge of international and global affairs.

After becoming a special adviser of the Jordanian-Palestinian Joint Committee in Amman, Jordan, Abdul Hadi accepted the post of special adviser to the Ministry of Occupied Land Affairs (1985–1986). He used his post to publish a booklet on the affairs of the occupied territories for the Jordanian community. With the Jordanian deportation of the Palestine Liberation Organization (PLO) figure Abu Jihad and the continued crisis between the Jordanians and the Palestinians, among other reasons, Abdul Hadi resigned and returned to Jerusalem.

Academics
Abdul Hadi participated in many conferences, among them the Salzburg Seminar for Divided Cities - Berlin, Jerusalem, and Belfast in February 1987.

The same year, together with a group of Palestinian intellectuals and academics Abdul Hadi founded the Palestinian Academic Society for the Study of International Affairs (PASSIA) in March 1987 to provide a forum for the free debate and analysis of a plurality of local and foreign perspectives. PASSIA is involved in four main areas. As part of its Research and Publication Programme, PASSIA has published over 120 different studies on a large diversity of subjects relevant to the Palestine question and the Palestinians, in addition to its highly popular annual diary. Another major component is the Dialogue Programme providing a venue for the presentation and discussion of a wide range of issues and viewpoints on matters of concern to Palestinians, with a focus on topical political events, interfaith issues and, most importantly, the question of Jerusalem which is a primary focus of Abdul Hadi’s interests and a core topic in PASSIA’s work. Speakers and participants at these meetings include local and foreign scholars, professionals, activists as well as representatives of political factions and the diplomatic corps. It can be said that PASSIA has proved most successful in serving as a catalyst for civic dialogue and in fostering a better understanding of Palestinian affairs - be they in the domestic or international context. A third pillar of the work undertaken by PASSIA is its Training and Education Programme, which provides a much-needed platform for Palestinian practitioners and professionals to deepen their knowledge and expertise in specific areas of international affairs and institutional/personal capacity building (with courses on strategic planning, leadership, management, and communication skills, to name a few).

Furthermore, Abdul Hadi has been involved in many projects throughout the region and worldwide. In 1990 he established the Black Sea University Institute in Bucharest and was active as external lecturer at Israeli and international universities, among them the distinguished Royal College of Defence Studies in Great Britain (1992–1997). His teachings focused on the Palestinian narrative and the Israeli-Palestinian conflict.

Together with Faisal Husseini he co-founded the Jerusalem National Committee in 1992 which later became the Jerusalem Arab Council (1993), as Abdul Hadi functioned at the Orient House under Faisal Husseini’s leadership. Also in 1995 he co-founded the EuroMeSCo Network and together with Hedra Abdul Shafi and many others created the Palestinian Council for Peace and Justice. In 2000 he was part of the founders of the Arab Team for Muslim and Christian Dialogue in Beirut and one year later became a member of the Arab Thought Forum of Prince Hassan bin Talal in Jordan (2001).

In 2006 he was honored by King Albert II of Belgium with the title Commander of the Order of the Crown. Since 2009 Abdul Hadi was also active as member of Board of Trustees of the Yasser Arafat Foundation and contributed in many statements, meetings and dialogue to end the Palestinian disengagement (since 2008). In 2011 he contributed to establishing the Arab Society for Development in Jerusalem. Furthermore, he was an active member in the Palestinian independent personality team which in many sessions worked towards Palestinian reconciliation and in 2011 Abdul Hadi witnessed the official signing of the Cairo reconciliation document, or Palestinian Prisoners' Document as it is also known.

Publications
Abdul Hadi has published numerous articles, monographs, and essays and edited several publications, including, most recently, 100 Years of Palestinian History, A 20th Century Chronology (2001).

Some other important publications include the following:
Palestine: Social Impact of the Islamist-Secularist Struggle, Carnegie Endowment, September 2006.
Sub-Regional Cooperation: The Case of the Middle East - A View from Palestine. Unpublished conference paper presented at a EuroMeSCO Working Group. Cairo: April 1999.
Dialogue on Palestinian State-Building and Identity - PASSIA Meetings 1995–1998. Jerusalem: PASSIA, January 1999.
Oslo: The Conflict, the Mediators and the Breakthrough. Conference paper presented at the Jeffrey Z. Rubin Memorial Conference of the Program on Negotiations, Harvard University. Massachusetts: October 1996.
"Palestinian Security Concerns," in: Common Security in the Middle East, Research Group on European Affairs, conference paper, 1996.
"The Future of Jerusalem - A Palestinian Perspective," in: Shu'un Tanmawiyyeh, Vol. 5, Nos. 2 & 3, Winter 1995/1996.
Israeli Settlements in Occupied Jerusalem and the West Bank 1967–1977. Jerusalem: Arab Thought Forum, 1978.
The Palestine Question and Peaceful Solutions 1934–1974. Saidun: Al-Assriya Publishing House, 1974

External links

Dr. Mahdi F. Abdul Hadi

1944 births
Alumni of the University of Bradford
Living people
Palestinian journalists
People from Nablus
20th-century Palestinian lawyers
Harvard Fellows